Vice Admiral Robert George Cooling  (born 11 July 1957) is a former Royal Navy officer who served as Assistant Chief of the Naval Staff.

Early life and education
Cooling was born on 11 July 1957. He was educated at Christ Church Cathedral School, Oxford and The King's School, Canterbury, both private schools. He studied international relations at Keele University, graduating with a Bachelor of Arts (BA) degree in 1978.

Naval career
Cooling joined the Royal Navy in 1978. He went on to command the patrol craft  and then the frigate . He became Commanding Officer of the frigate  as well as Captain of the 6th Frigate Squadron in 1998 and Director of Naval Staff Duties at the Ministry of Defence in 2002. He went on to be Commanding Officer of the aircraft carrier  in 2004, Deputy Commander of Strike Force (South) in 2006 and Assistant Chief of the Naval Staff in February 2008. Promoted to vice admiral, he became the chief of staff to NATO's Supreme Allied Command Transformation at Norfolk, Virginia in July 2009 before retiring in November 2011.

Later life
Cooling was appointed a Board Member of the Strategy and Integration Advisory Board of Quindell Portfolio plc in March 2012.

References

1957 births
Living people
Royal Navy vice admirals
Companions of the Order of the Bath
Alumni of Keele University
People educated at Christ Church Cathedral School
People educated at The King's School, Canterbury